Late Night is a 2019 American comedy-drama film directed by Nisha Ganatra from a screenplay also produced by Mindy Kaling. It stars Emma Thompson as a popular TV host who hires a new writer (Kaling) to keep from getting replaced. Max Casella, Hugh Dancy, John Lithgow, Denis O'Hare, Reid Scott, and Amy Ryan also star.

The project was first announced in 2016, with Fox 2000 Pictures set to produce Kaling's script and Paul Feig signed on to direct. In August 2017, Ganatra replaced Feig and the film was picked up by FilmNation Entertainment. Much of the cast joined in April 2018 and filming began later that month in New York City. Following its premiere at the Sundance Film Festival on January 25, 2019, Amazon Studios bought the domestic distribution rights for a record $13 million.

Late Night was theatrically released in the United States on June 7, 2019. The film received positive reviews from critics, with praise for its social satire and commentary, screenplay, as well as Thompson's performance. For her performance, Thompson received a nomination at the 77th Golden Globe Awards for Best Actress – Motion Picture Comedy or Musical.

Plot

Katherine Newbury is an acclaimed late-night talk show host with an extensive career in comedy, but her show's ratings have seen a steady decline over the past decade. The network's president, Caroline Morton, tells Katherine to fix up her show or she will be replaced.

In an attempt to revamp the show, Katherine has Molly Patel hired to her writing staff, mainly on the basis that she is an Indian-American woman while all remaining writers are white men. Although Molly has little experience in comedy and initially struggles, she proves her worth by giving Katherine good material to work with on her show as well as ideas on how to reach out to a bigger audience. The results prove successful.

Katherine learns that Caroline wants to pick young, popular comedian Daniel Tennant to replace her as the new host. Katherine resists, as Daniel's comedy is vulgar and misogynistic. With backup from her writers, Katherine defies the network's demands and decides on air to continue her career.

An email from one of the writers, Charlie, gets leaked, in which it is revealed that Katherine had an affair with him after her husband Walter was initially diagnosed with Parkinson's disease. In the midst of the drama, Katherine fires Molly after she criticizes her for her response to the news. Eventually, Katherine makes amends with Walter and the other writers and admits her affair to her audience. Her sincerity and passion for the show convinces Caroline to let her stick around, and Katherine later apologizes to Molly, hiring her back. The show continues to stay on air.

One year later, the show's team has diversified, Molly is promoted to co-lead monologue writer, and Katherine's show is more successful than ever.

Cast

Production
In September 2016, it was reported that Fox 2000 had bought the rights to the project, written by Mindy Kaling, who was also set to costar alongside Emma Thompson. In November 2016, Paul Feig signed on to direct the film. However, in August 2017, Nisha Ganatra was announced as director when Feig dropped out due to scheduling conflicts.

In February 2018, it was reported that 30West and FilmNation Entertainment would co-finance the film and sell distribution rights. In April 2018, John Lithgow, Hugh Dancy, Reid Scott, Paul Walter Hauser, Denis O'Hare, John Early, Max Casella and Megalyn Echikunwoke joined the cast, with filming commencing April 23, 2018 in Canada. Amy Ryan joined the cast in May.

Release
Late Night had its world premiere at the Sundance Film Festival on January 25, 2019. Shortly after, Amazon Studios acquired U.S. distribution rights to the film for $13 million, the largest sum paid for U.S.-only distribution at the festival.

The film began its U.S. theatrical play with a limited release on June 7, 2019, in Los Angeles and New York City, and expanded to the rest of the US the following weekend. Amazon's marketing budget for the film amounted to roughly $35 million.

Reception

Box office
Late Night grossed $15.5 million in the United States and Canada, and $6.9 million in other territories, for a worldwide total of $22.4 million. In June 2019, the film was estimated to have lost Amazon $40 million due to the cost of acquisition and marketing.

In its limited opening weekend, the film made $249,694 from four theaters, for a per-venue average of $62,414, the second-best of 2019. The film expanded on June 14, opposite the openings of Men in Black: International and Shaft, and was projected to gross $5 million from 2,218 theaters over the weekend. It ended up making $5.1 million, finishing ninth. While in-line with projections, the opening was viewed as disappointing given the positive critical reception and the studio's cost of acquisition. However, Deadline Hollywood noted the film was essentially an advertisement for streaming on Amazon Prime, and audiences may be waiting to see it later. It made $2.6 million the following weekend, dropping 51% to 12th.

Critical response
The website's critical consensus reads, "Smart, timely, and brought to life by a terrific cast, Late Night is a workplace comedy with a lot of heart—and just as many laughs." On Metacritic, the film has a weighted average score of 70 out of 100, based on 46 critics, indicating "generally favorable reviews." Audiences polled by CinemaScore gave the film an average grade of "B+" on an A+ to F scale, while those at PostTrak gave it an average 3.5 out of 5 stars, with women (who made up 71% of the demographic) grading it an overall positive score of 80%.

A.O. Scott of The New York Times described the film's humor as "sharp" yet "cruelty-free," and wrote "[Late Night] argues that entertainment benefits from the presence of different faces and voices not by preaching but by example." Owen Gleiberman of Variety magazine called the film "lively yet scattershot" and praised Thompson's performance, saying "Thompson truly seems like a born talk-show host. Even when she's just riffing, she grounds Late Night in something real." Anthony Kaufman of ScreenDaily also praised Thompson for "a memorable performance as the abrasive 'cold witch,' as someone describes her, perhaps even outdoing Meryl Streep's Miranda Priestly in The Devil Wears Prada as a delightfully wicked woman of power." Leah Greenblatt of Entertainment Weekly also praised Thompson's performance, saying her "gravitas holds the center," and that "the best scenes in Late Night are consistently the ones where the movie's main stars spar and banter and intermittently connect." Greenblatt praised director Nisha Ganatra for refreshing classic romantic comedy tropes, but added that the tone is at times "scattershot and sometimes too sitcom-ish."

Alissa Wilkinson of Vox.com says "Late Night is a workplace comedy that feels like a cousin of The Devil Wears Prada, and its greatest strength is its two lead characters." She also wrote, "Late Night feels underwritten in some spots, but it's surprising in others—an unfussy, entertaining comedy with some serious matters on its mind." Richard Lawson of Vanity Fair described it as "a genial, funny movie, not a mile-a-minute behind-the-cameras gag-fest (hyphens!) like 30 Rock, but an amiable workplace comedy that finds personal definition in its influences." Sheila O'Malley of RogerEbert.com rated the film  out of 4 stars, specifying that is "an earnest and funny comedy, with very sharp teeth."

Accolades

Notes

References

External links
 
 

2019 films
2019 comedy-drama films
3 Arts Entertainment films
Amazon Studios films
American comedy-drama films
Films about comedians
Films about screenwriters
Films about television people
Films directed by Nisha Ganatra
Films scored by Lesley Barber
Films set in New York City
Films set in Pennsylvania
Films shot in New York City
Works by Mindy Kaling
Workplace comedy films
2010s English-language films
2010s American films